The 1949–50 Northern Football League season was the 52nd in the history of the Northern Football League, a football competition in Northern England.

Clubs

The league featured 14 clubs which competed in the last season, no new clubs joined the league this season. 

Crook Colliery Welfare changed name to Crook Town.

League table

References

1949-50
4